McAdam is a civil parish in York County, New Brunswick, Canada.

For governance purposes it is divided between the village of McAdam and the local service district of the parish of McAdam, both of which are members of the Southwest New Brunswick Service Commission (SNBSC).

Origin of name
The parish was named in honour of John McAdam, a timber merchant and politician who died in 1893.

History
McAdam was erected in 1895 from Prince William and Dumfries Parishes.

Boundaries
McAdam Parish is bounded:

 on the northeast by a line beginning at a point about 825 metres east of Moon Pond, then running southeasterly along grant lines, crossing Shogomoc Lake, to the prolongation of the eastern line of large grants to the New Brunswick Railway Company and New Brunswick and Canada Railway and Land Company east of McAdam, then southerly along the railway grants, crossing Magaguadavic Lake, to the railway north of Mink Lake, then running south-southwesterly, south-southeasterly, and southerly, crossing Route 4 to a point about 1 kilometre south of Route 4 and 2.9 kilometres southwest of its junction with Diffen Road;
 on the southeast by a line paralleling the Sunbury County line, as with other parishes south of the Saint John River, striking the Charlotte County line about 3 kilometres east of Route 630;
 on the south by the Charlotte County line;
 on the west and southwest by the international border, running through the St. Croix River and Spednic Lake;
 on the northwest by a line beginning west of Sandy Point and running northeasterly, paralleling the southeastern line, to the starting point.

Communities
Communities at least partly within the parish. bold indicates an incorporated municipality; italics indicate a name no longer in official use

 Burpee
 Cottrell
  McAdam
 Newcomb
  St. Croix
 Sugar Brook

Bodies of water
Bodies of water at least partly within the parish.

 Digdeguash River
  St. Croix River
 Canoose Stream
 Diggity Stream
 Shogomoc Stream
 Musquash Flowage
 Magaguadavic Lake
  Palfrey Lake
 Spednic Lake
 more than fifteen other officially named lakes

Islands
Islands at least partly within the parish.

 Bells Island
 Ben Beachs Island
 Big Island
 Cummings Island
 Estys Island
 Hardwood Island
 Lindsay Island
 Little Indian Island
 Long Island
 Luffs Island
 O'Malleys Island
 Parker Island
 Star Island
 Todds Island
 Varney Island
 Whites Island
 Williams Island
 Works Island

Other notable places
Parks, historic sites, and other noteworthy places at least partly within the parish.
 Spednic Lake Protected Natural Area

Demographics
Parish population total does not include  village of McAdam

Population
Population trend

 The net change from 2006 to 2016 (80 people to 73) is a decline of 8.75%

Language
Mother tongue (2016)

Access Routes
Highways and numbered routes that run through the parish, including external routes that start or finish at the parish limits:

Highways

Principal Routes
None

Secondary Routes:
None

External Routes:
None

See also
List of parishes in New Brunswick

Notes

References

External links
 Village of McAdam

Parishes of York County, New Brunswick
Local service districts of York County, New Brunswick